Campeonato Paranaense, which has been contested since 1915, is the top-flight football league of the state of Paraná, Brazil.

Format

The format has changed in 2014. 12 teams are together in a single group. They play against each other once, and the 8 best teams after the 11 games will play the knockout phase that teams will play against each other over two legs on a home-and-away basis.
The last 4 teams will play the Torneio da Morte, where they will play against each other two times (home-away), the best two teams will stay in the Série Ouro, the first division of the football of the state and the two worst will be relegated to the Série Prata, the second division.
The best four teams will ensure place in the 2015 Copa do Brasil and the two best that won't play in any division of the 2014 Campeonato Brasileiro will ensure place in the 2014 Campeonato Brasileiro Série D.

Clubs

Atlético Paranaense
Cascavel
Cianorte
Coritiba
Maringá
Londrina
União
Foz do Iguaçu
Paraná Clube
Prudentópolis
Rio Branco
Toledo

List of champions

Notes
 In 1924 Internacional and América merged into the Club Athletico Paranaense.
 In 1971 Britânia, Ferroviário and Palestra Itália merged into the Colorado Esporte Clube.
 In 1971 Água Verde and Savóia merged into the Esporte Clube Pinheiros.
 In 1989 Colorado and Pinheiros merged into the Paraná Clube.
 In 2002 Iraty won the official championship; clubs playing in the Copa Sul-Minas did not compete in this but instead played for the 'super championship', which was won by Atlético.

Titles by team 

Teams in bold still active.

By city

See also
 Atle-Tiba

References

External links
FPF Official Website

 
Paranaense